Lee Sharp Lorenz (October 17, 1932 – December 8, 2022) was an American cartoonist most notable for his work in The New Yorker.

Early life and education
Lorenz was born on October 17, 1932 in Hackensack, New Jersey. After studying at North Junior High School in Newburgh, New York, where he starred in student productions, he continued with his education at Carnegie Tech and Pratt Institute.

Career
His first published cartoon appeared in Colliers in 1956, and two years later he became a contract contributor to The New Yorker, which has published more than 1,600 of his drawings. He was The New Yorkers art editor for 25 years, from 1973 until 1993, continuing as cartoon editor until 1997.

Lorenz was a musician who played cornet with his own group, the Creole Cookin' Jazz Band.

Lorenz edited and wrote books on the art in The New Yorker, as well as the artists themselves, including The Art of The New Yorker (1995) and The World of William Steig (1998).

Lorenz is featured drawing in Lyda Ely's documentary film Funny Business (2009), which visited the studios of 11 cartoonists for The New Yorker.

Personal life
Lorenz was first married to Joan Gaillardet. Together they had two children. Their marriage ended in divorce. He then married Jill Runcie and divorced. He then married and later divorced Jane Plant.

Lorenz died on December 8, 2022, at his home in Norwalk, Connecticut, at the age of 90.

Awards
He received the National Cartoonists Society's Gag Cartoon Award for 1995 for his work.

Bibliography

 Here It Comes (Bobbs-Merrill Co., Inc. 1968)
 Now Look What You've Done! (Pantheon, 1977)
 Hugo and the Spacedog (Prentice-Hall, 1983)
 The Golden Age of Trash (Chronicle Books, 1987)
 The Essential George Booth (Workman, 1998)
 The Essential Charles Barsotti (Workman, 1998)
 The Art of The New Yorker 1925 -1995, (Knopf, 1995)
 The World of William Steig (Artisan, 1998)
 The Essential Jack Ziegler (Workman, 2001)
 Big Gus and Little Gus (Prentice-Hall, 1982)

References

External links
 National Cartoonists Society Awards
 The Cartoon Bank
 2011 interview in The Comics Journal

1932 births
2022 deaths
American cartoonists
The New Yorker cartoonists
The New Yorker people
The New Yorker editors
American jazz cornetists
Eli's Chosen Six members
Writers from Hackensack, New Jersey